Hohenfinow is a municipality in the Barnim district in Brandenburg, Germany. It is part of the Amt ("collective municipality") Amt Britz-Chorin-Oderberg.

Geography
It is part of a rural area on the northeastern rim of the Barnim Plateau, south of the Finow River and the Finow Canal. The glacial valley in the north with the neighbouring municipality of Niederfinow separates it from the adjacent Uckermark region. The historic village centre is surrounded by extended fields, meadows and pine forests.

History

A fortress overlooking the Finow valley and a ford across the river was erected about 1220, after the area settled by Polabian Slavs had been conquered by the Ascanian margraves of Brandenburg. The foundations of the parish church date back to around 1250. The settlement itself was first mentioned in a 1334 deed issued by the Wittelsbach margrave Louis I.

Temporarily held by Count Henry Matthias of Thurn, the estates were sold to the Pfuel noble family in 1614. During the indecisive stance of Brandenburg in the Thirty Years' War, Hohenfinow was devastated by a contingent under Ernst von Mansfeld in 1626, and again by Imperial, Saxon and Swedish troops in the following years. The rebuilding began with three remaining farmsteads. In 1780 the cornfields of Hohenfinow were mentioned in a travel account by Johann III Bernoulli.

In 1855 the Hohenfinow manor was purchased by Felix von Bethmann Hollweg (1824–1900), scion of a Frankfurt banking dynasty and father of the later German chancellor Theobald von Bethmann Hollweg, who was born here in 1856. In the last days of World War II, a unit of the "Army Detachment Steiner" rested near Hohenfinow before the troops withdraw to Eberswalde.

Demography

References

Localities in Barnim